Countess Emilie of Reichenbach-Lessonitz née Ortlöpp (13 May 1791 in Berlin – 12 February 1843 in Frankfurt) was the mistress and later second wife of Elector William II of Hesse.

Life 

Emilie was the second daughter of the goldsmith Johann Christian Ortlöpp and his wife Agnes Louise Sophie, née Weißenberg from Berlin, and from 1812, the mistress of the Elector William II of Hesse, whom she had met during a stay in Berlin.  He brought her to Kassel in 1813, leading to a de facto termination of his marriage with Princess Augusta of Prussia, but for political reasons, he was not allowed to divorce his wife.  In 1815, William and Augusta were separated from bed and board.

In 1821, William raised her to Countess Reichenbach (named after Reichenbach Castle in Hessisch Lichtenau) and in 1824, she received the Austrian title of Countess of Lessonitz after William had purchased the Moravian estates of Lessonitz, Bzenec and Dolní Moštěnice for her. At the same time she and her children received the Austrian citizenship.

Their relationship caused a scandal; they even received death threats.  The Countess was probably unpopular and was alleged to have had a negative impact on William's politics, or at least some of his political failures were attributed to her.

Their relationship was one of the reasons why the William did not return to his capital Kassel after the 1830 revolution.

Augusta died on 19 February 1841.  William and Emilie married morganatically on 8 July 1841 at Bzenec Castle in Moravia.  Their witness was State Chancellor Prince Klemens von Metternich.

Emilie died on 12 February 1843 in Frankfurt am Main to a liver infection and was buried at the Frankfurt Main Cemetery in Frankfurt. The Elector commissioned the architect Friedrich Maximilian Hessemer, to create a mausoleum in the Byzantine style. The crucifix inside was created by the sculptor .  The marble sarcophagus was commissioned by the Countess's children and created in 1863 by the sculptor Eduard Schmidt von der Launitz. Elector Frederick William, who had succeeded his father by then, tried every diplomatic means available to prevent his father's sculpture from being installed in the mausoleum, but achieved nothing in the Free City of Frankfurt.  Today, the tomb with a capstone from 1847, contains six coffins.

After Emilie's death, William married a third time, with Caroline of Berlepsch (1820–1877).  He died on 20 November 1847 and was buried in the countly crypt of the St. Mary's Church in Hanau.

Issue 
Emilie and William had eight children:
 Louise (born: 26 February 1813 in Berlin; died: 3 October 1883 in Baden-Baden), married on 15  May 1845 with Imperial Secret Councillor Count Charles August von Bose (born: 7 November 1814 in Garmisch; died: 25 December 1887 in Baden-Baden).  Louise von Bose was an important patron of the arts.
 Julius William (born: 4 October 1815 in Kassel; died: 15 January 1822 in Kassel).
 Amalia Wilhelmine Emilie (born: 31 December 1816 in Kassel; died: 28 July 1858 in Dresden).
 married in 1836 Count William of Luckner (born: 29 January 1805; died: 19 February 1865); divorced 1839
 married in 1840 Baron Charles of Watzdorff (born: 9 March 1807 in Dresden; died: 5 December 1846  Dresden)
 married Count William von Luckner again in 1847
 Charles (born: 24 August 1818 in Kassel; died: 26 September 1881 in Prague)
 married on 20 December 1861 with Clementine Richter (born: 28 August 1842 in Prague; died: 13 July 1902 in Bad Ischl)
 Emilie (born: 8 June 1820 in Kassel; died: 30 January 1891 in Budapest)
 married on 10 March 1839 with Count Felix Zichy-Ferraris of Zich and Vásonkeö (born: 20 November 1810; died: 8 September 1885 in Szilvás, Hungary)
 Friederike (born: 16 December 1821 in Kassel, died 23 February 1898 in Weilburg)
 married on 3 November 1841 with  Baron William of Dungern (born: 20 June 1809 in Weilburg; died: 3 July 1874 in Bad Wildbad)
 William (born: 29 June 1824 in Kassel; died: 19 January 1866 in Neuchâtel)
 married on 19 March 1857  (born: 27 April 1838 in Karlsruhe; died: 14 March 1912 in Frankfurt)
 Helene (born: 8 August 1825 at Schloss Wilhelmshöhe Castle; died: 14 May 1898 in Munich)
 married on 4 January 1844 with Baron Oswald of Fabrice (born: 8 January 1820 in Bonn; died: 3 June 1898 in Munich)

References 
 Walter Fraeb: Über Kurfürst Wilhelm II. und die Gräfin Reichenbach in Hanau, in: Magazin für Hanauische Geschichte, vol. 8, Hanau, 1929, p. 49–63
 Gustav Funke: Emilie Ortlepp Gräfin von Reichenbach-Lessonitz. Die Frankfurter Exiljahre von Kurfürst Wilhelm II. von Hessen-Kassel, in: Frankfurt – lebendige Stadt. Vierteljahreshefte für Kultur, Wirtschaft und Verkehr, vol. 6, 1991, issue 4
 Michel Huberty: L' Allemagne dynastique : Les 15 familles qui ont fait l'empire, vol. 1: Hesse - Reuss - Saxe, Le Perreux-sur-Marne, 1976,

Footnotes

External links 
 Grave chapel and Mausoleum

German countesses
People from Frankfurt
People from Hanau
Emilie of Reichenbach-Lessonitz
1791 births
1843 deaths
19th-century German people
Morganatic spouses of German royalty